Wayne may refer to:

People with the given name and surname 
 Wayne (given name)
 Wayne (surname)

Geographical 
Places with name Wayne may take their name from a person with that surname; the most famous such person was Gen. "Mad" Anthony Wayne from the former Northwest Territory during the American revolutionary period.

Places in Canada
 Wayne, Alberta

Places in the United States
Cities, towns and unincorporated communities:
 Wayne, Illinois
 Wayne City, Illinois
 Wayne, Indiana
 Wayne, Kansas
 Wayne, Maine
 Wayne, Michigan
 Wayne, Nebraska
 Wayne, New Jersey
 Wayne, New York
 Wayne, Ohio
 Wayne, Oklahoma
 Wayne, Pennsylvania
 Wayne, West Virginia
 Wayne, Lafayette County, Wisconsin
 Wayne, Washington County, Wisconsin
 Wayne (community), Wisconsin
 

Other places:
 Wayne County (disambiguation)
 Wayne Township (disambiguation)
 Waynesborough, Gen. Anthony Wayne's early homestead in Pennsylvania
 Wayne National Forest in southeastern Ohio
 John Wayne Airport, Orange County, CA
 Fort Wayne (disambiguation)

Educational institutions 
 Wayne State University, Michigan
 Wayne State College, Nebraska

Other
 Diocese of Fort Wayne-South Bend
 Fountains of Wayne, American rock band from New York City
 Wayne's World, a recurring sketch on Saturday Night Live
Wayne's World (film) and Wayne's World 2, films based on the Saturday Night Live sketch
 Wayne Corporation, U.S. manufacturer of motor vehicles
 Wayne, car assembled by Byron F. Everitt, of E-M-F Company
 Wayne (band), metal band led by David Wayne
 Wayne (TV series), TV series on YouTube Premium
 Lil Wayne, American rapper from New Orleans, Louisiana
 Pauline Wayne, U.S. President William H. Taft's pet cow
 Typhoon Wayne (disambiguation)
 Wayne Oil Tank and Pump Company, part of Dresser Industries

See also 
 Wain (disambiguation)
 WAYN (disambiguation)